Janesville is the name of several places in the United States of America:

Janesville, California
Janesville, Iowa
Janesville, Minnesota
Janesville, Wisconsin
Janesville (town), Wisconsin
Janesville Township, Minnesota

Janesville may also refer to:
Janesville: An American Story, a book by Amy Goldstein

See also
Janeville, a community in Gloucester County, New Brunswick, Canada
Jamesville (disambiguation)